Inje-eup is a town in and the seat of the county of Inje, Gangwon Province, South Korea.

References

External links
 Official website

Inje County
Towns and townships in Gangwon Province, South Korea